Querétaro, is a town in the Mexicali Municipality, Baja California.  It is located on Highway 2 between Mexicali and San Luis Río Colorado.

Populated places in Baja California
Mexicali Municipality
Populated places in the Sonoran Desert
Communities in the Lower Colorado River Valley